Deniz Seki (born July 1, 1970) is a Turkish pop singer, songwriter and composer.

Personal life
Deniz Seki was born in Istanbul, Turkey on July 1, 1970. She has two younger brothers Serdar and Serkan. She completed her education in Çamlıca High School for Girls.

In 1989, Seki married to Turhan Başaranoğlu, a businessman producing toys. The marriage ended after three years with divorce. Between 2006 and 2009, she had a relationship with the clarinet-player Hüsnü Şenlendirici, who is married and father of two.

Music career
She joined TRT after passing a test. In 1993, she began a musician career when she met composer Melih Kibar. Through him, she worked as a vocalist for the singers Kenan Doğulu, Emel Müftüoğlu, Ege, Ferda Anıl Yarkın, Zuhal Olcay and Yaşar Günaç. In 1995, she won the first prize at the song contest "Pop-Show 1995" with a song she wrote the lyrics. She released her debut album Hiç kimse Değilim in 1997. Seki established her success with the 1999-released her second album  Anlattım consisting of many songs written and composed by her. She released her third album Şeffaf in January 2002, and Aşkların En Güzeli in 2003. After appearing in nearly one hundred concerts and programs in 2011, she released her next album Gözyaşlarım. In 2013, Seki took part at the television song contest Veliaht, at which popular singers such as Nükhet Duru, Hande Yener, Cengiz Kurtoğlu, Musa Eroğlu, Niran Ünsal, Emre Altuğ, Kutsi, Rafet El Roman and Kubat sought their heirs in music. Seki continued her career with the albums Aşk Denizi (2005), Sahici (2008), Sözyaşlarım (2011), İz (2014), and Uzun Hikaye (2018).

Acting career
In 1999, she appeared in the movie Can Dostum starred by Oktay Kaynarca and Yalçın Dümer. During her stay in the prison, she was guest actress in the December-2015 episode of the television series Eşkıya Dünyaya Hükümdar Olmaz by ATV appearing as the cell inmate of Deniz Çakır's character.

Drug trafficking crime
On February 13, 2009, Seki was detained by police on allegations of cocaine use. After being kept in detention for two days, she was released without charge; however, on February 23, 2009, Seki was rearrested by Drug Squad officers and detained at the gendarme station in Zekeriyaköy, Istanbul at the request of the public prosecutor. On February 24, 2010, she was detained in the Bakırköy Women's Prison for the duration of the trial. She was accused of drug trafficking crime. She asserted however, she was a drug addict only. Following her temporary release on November 2, 2010, after around seven months in detention, she vanished without a trace and did not appear in court any more. On May 22, 2012, she was charged for six years and three months in prison of drug trafficking crime. The seven months spent as a detainee was deducted from her sentence. On November 15, 2014, Seki was caught in her hideout at Esenyurt, Istanbul and arrested. She was put in prison the next day. After serving her sentence, she was released from the prison on June 5, 2017.

Discography
Studio albums
1997: Hiç Kimse Değilim (Turkish: I Am No One)
1999: Anlattım (Turkish: I Said)
2002: Şeffaf (Turkish: Transparent)
2003: Aşkların En Güzeli (Turkish: The Most Beautiful of Loves)
2005: Aşk Denizi (Turkish: Sea of Love)
2008: Sahici (Turkish: Realist)
2011: Sözyaşlarım (Turkish: My Tearful Lyrics, a pun of "Söz" (lyrics) and "Gözyaşlarım" (tears)) (sales: 50,000+)
2014: İz (Turkish: Trace) (sales: 40,000+)
2018: Uzun Hikaye (Turkish: Long Story)

EPs
2017: Şükür Kavuşturana

Singles
2020: "Ala" (with Demet Akalın, Işın Karaca, Cansu Kurtçu)
2021: "Savaş ve Aşk"
2022: "Sızı"
2022: "Beni Derde Salan Gelsin" (Musa Eroğlu ile Bir Asır 2)
2022: "Aşktan Ölen Yok"

Bibliography

References

External links
 

1970 births
Living people
Singers from Istanbul
Turkish pop singers
Turkish singer-songwriters
Turkish composers
Turkish prisoners and detainees
Turkish people convicted of drug offenses
Inmates of Bakırköy Prison for Women
21st-century Turkish singers
21st-century Turkish women singers